Candalides ardosiacea is a species of butterfly of the family Lycaenidae. It was described by Gerald Edward Tite in 1963. It is found on the Aru Islands and from West Irian to Papua New Guinea.

References

Candalidini
Butterflies described in 1963